Moyencharia winteri is a moth of the family Cossidae. It is found in south-western Sudan and the north-eastern part of the Democratic Republic of the Congo. The range probably extends into the Central African Republic. The habitat consists of a mosaic of wooded farmland, swampy sites, savanna with drier peripheral semi-evergreen Guineo-Congolian rain forests and riparian forests at low elevations.

The wingspan is about 32 mm. The forewings are ecru olive with liver brown markings. The hindwings are ecru olive with a glinty shine.

Etymology
The species is named for Philip Enever Winter.

References

Moths described in 2013
Moyencharia
Insects of the Democratic Republic of the Congo
Fauna of the Central African Republic
Moths of Africa